John Robert Leopold Bulmer (28 December 1867 – 20 January 1917) was an English first-class cricketer, who played in the 1891 Roses match at Bradford Park Avenue, for Yorkshire County Cricket Club in 1891.  A right arm fast medium bowler he took one wicket for 79, and recorded a pair with the bat as Yorkshire fell to defeat by 8 wickets.

Born in Guisborough, Yorkshire, England, in present-day Redcar and Cleveland, Bulmer also played for the Yorkshire Second XI in 1897.

He died aged 49, in January 1917, in Werneth, Oldham, Lancashire.

References

External links
Cricinfo Profile
Cricket Archive Statistics

1867 births
1917 deaths
Yorkshire cricketers
People from Guisborough
English cricketers
Cricketers from Yorkshire